Ars Mathematica Contemporanea is a quarterly peer-reviewed scientific journal covering discrete mathematics in connection with other branches of mathematics. It is published by the University of Primorska together with the Society of Mathematicians, Physicists and Astronomers of Slovenia, the Institute of Mathematics, Physics, and Mechanics, and the Slovenian Discrete and Applied Mathematics Society. It is a platinum open access journal, with articles published under the Creative Commons Attribution 4.0 license.

Abstracting and indexing
The journal is indexed by:
Current Contents/Physical, Chemical & Earth Sciences
Mathematical Reviews
Science Citation Index Expanded
Scopus
zbMATH
According to the Journal Citation Reports, the journal has a 2018 impact factor of 0.910.

See also 
 List of academic journals published in Slovenia

References

External links

Combinatorics journals
Open access journals
Publications established in 2008
English-language journals
Academic journals published in Slovenia
University of Primorska
Academic journals of Slovenia